Lalzuia Colney is an Indian academic and writer of Mizo literature.

Career
An alumnus of the Government Champhai College, he is a teacher at KVM High School, Mizoram. He has written several books and has contributed chapters to books published by others. Some of his books are prescribed texts for academic studies in Mizoram as well as for the Indian Certificate of Secondary Education (ICSE) examinations.

Awards
 His book, A phêk ropui chungah, won the Book of the Year Award in 2014. 
 In 2010, the Government of India awarded him the Padma Shri, India's fourth highest civilian award, for his contributions to literature.

Publications
Some of the Publications by Lalzuia are as follows:
 Mizo tawng ziak dan
 Mizo Thu leh Hla
 Lal hlau lo thi
 Dictionary of Mizo language
 Mizo literacy
 Westminster Abbey
 Zonunkima (Drama)
 Without bringing piece of pipe
 To Holy Land (Israel)

See also 
 Mizo literature

References

External links 
 

Recipients of the Padma Shri in literature & education
Year of birth missing (living people)
Scholars from Mizoram
Mizo people
Indian male writers
Living people